Boydell is an English surname. Notable people with the surname include:

 Brian Boydell (1917–2000), Irish composer
 James Boydell (died 1860), British inventor
 John Boydell (1720–1804), English publisher
 Josiah Boydell (1752–1817), English publisher and painter

English-language surnames